Automobile Year (formerly as Annual Automobile Review) is a yearbook specialising in  automobile and motorsport, published annually in three different languages; English,  French (as L'Année Automobile), German (as Auto-Jahr). More recent editions now carry the tagline: "The Annual For Car Enthusiasts". Most recently, from issue 63 in 2015, it is only published in French, as "L'Annee Automobile".

History
The book, then titled Annual Automobile Review was launched in 1953 by Ami Guichard (1921–1986), a Swiss motoring writer and entrepreneur from Lausanne who published it through his company, Edita S.A. He brought along the best writers and photographers he knew including Charles Faroux (the founder of the 24 Hours of Le Mans), Giovanni Lurani and Yves Debraine. One of the other contributor, Bernard Cahier was credited by  Guichard for introducing him to the world of motorsport. Unlike the German and French editions, the English edition in 1956 underwent a name change when it became Automobile Year, relegating its original title to the book's subtitle and banishing it the following year.

Jean-Rodolphe Piccard, the book's deputy editor of ten years, replaced Guichard in 1986, following his sudden death, in turn, his publishing company Editions JR took over the running of the book. In 2005 Piccard retired and Christian Philippsen, a Monégasque motoring industry consultant, took over the running of the yearbook. In 2009 ETA-I of France took over publication of the Annual, after purchasing the rights from Christian Philippsen.

Book content
Since its launch, the book is split into three different sections, Industry, Motorsport and Culture. Following an introduction by the editor, the book begins with a section about the motor industry with news and new car launches. The motorsport section follows, starting with a section on Formula One and highly significant single seater series (A1GP, Indianapolis 500, IRL and Champ Car), followed by endurance racing reviews (24 Hours of Le Mans, Le Mans Series, American Le Mans Series and FIA GT Championship), then touring car racing and finally rallying (World Rally Championship and Dakar Rally). A section for car culture concludes the series.

Difference to previous editions
Prior to when Philippsen came to the helm, the book was split into two sections, a section featuring new automobile launches and culture and motorsport season reviews with results points table following that.

In the past, sportscar racing had always followed F1, then the US racing scene, rallying, F3000 and finally touring cars ends the section.

The US Open wheel racing coverage, CART in particular, was placed within the US racing section along with NASCAR and the Trans-Am Series, nowadays, it follows the F1 coverage. Despite being a stock car racing series, NASCAR is now placed within the touring car section with WTCC and DTM. Until 1989, these and the IMSA Camel GT series was the only non-FIA events the book covered. The IMSA series, until 1985, was covered within the US racing section, when followed the World Sportscar Championship coverage in their own section.

Until the series demise, the touring car section dealt only the European Touring Car Championship, excepting for 1987 when it covered the World Touring Car Championship. After that, it covered significant European domestic series such as DTM {Deutsche Tourenwagen Meisterschaft}

Also previously featured in its own section was significant FIA European single seater series such as F3000, its precessor F2 and F3.

The book concludes with a race result section, featuring a depth by depth results of each F1 and 24 hours of Le Mans races covered with a points table of FIA series, these are now incorporated into their own section.

List of Automobile Year editions

Past contributors
John Fitch (1954)
Paul Frère (1954)
Denis Jenkinson (1955)
Giovanni Lurani (1954)
Gordon Murray

Günther Molter
Federico Kirbus (1955)
 (editor in chief 1972–1973, 1976)

References

External links
Official site
Official U.S. site

1953 establishments in France
Annual magazines
Auto racing magazines
Formula One mass media
Magazines published in France
IndyCar Series mass media
Magazines established in 1953
NASCAR magazines
Books about cars
French-language magazines